The Inverness Cup is a football competition for teams around Inverness in the Scottish Highlands. Originally, it was contested by the four Inverness based teams: Caledonian, Citadel, Clachnacuddin and Thistle, but became an invitational tournament to increase the number of clubs competing.

Interest in the tournament eventually diminished, with competition from the Highland League Cup and North of Scotland Cup, along with fixture congestion for the clubs now playing in the SPFL.

Although the competition has never formally been discontinued, it hasn't been contested since 2005–06.

Winners

References

Football cup competitions in Scotland
Football in Highland (council area)
Sport in Inverness
Football in Moray